The FPV GT R-spec is a range of enhanced FPV vehicles characterised by an upgraded handling package fitted to the base model GT, range-topping GT-P and turbocharged F6 Typhoon models. At the time of its production, the GT & GT-P "R-spec" was the quickest Australian production car ever produced.

Overview
With the introduction of the Ford Falcon BF Mk2, FPV introduced the "R-spec" in limited numbers. The biggest upgrade comprised new suspension dampers supplied by Delphi, which provided better steering feel, turn-in and response without compromising general road comfort. FPV also added a higher capacity separate oil cooler to automatic transmission models to cater for track use. This upgraded handling package was tested by legendary Australian racing identity John Bowe, who was able to cut 3 seconds a lap over the normal GT models at Winton Raceway.

BF series

GT "40th Anniversary" 
The FPV GT-P "40th Anniversary" model commemorates 40 years of the Falcon "GT" nameplate in Australia, commencing with the original XR series of 1967. It was released in April 2007 and retailed for $65,110 (excluding dealer delivery and statutory charges).

Only 200 units were built, 175 released to Australia and 25 to New Zealand making it, not only the first "R-spec" model, but is also the rarest. Each car was fitted with a unique build number badge in the centre console and all vehicles sold came with a certificate of authenticity, FPV floor mats, Recaro GT-P front seats and integrated iPod/MP3 player input. The "GT-P 40th Anniversary" was available with six-speed  manual or six-speed automatic transmission with over-rev upshift function and could be optioned with upgraded 6 piston front / 4 piston rear Brembo brakes- a $7,000 option. In total, 111 units were manual (with 14 also featuring the upgraded Brembo brakes) and 89 automatic vehicles (with 9 autos also fitted with the upgraded front & rear Brembo brake package).

All vehicles were finished in Silhouette black with contrasting stripe packages (with one GT-P vehicle, build number 146, produced with promotional 'Brembo red' stripes over Silhouette black). All vehicles were fitted with 19-inch alloy wheels with black accents to complete the exterior package.

When this model was released, build number 1 and 40 were not available for sale to the general public due to the significances of the numbers.

F6 Typhoon "R-Spec" 
FPV followed on with the  FPV F6 Typhoon. In 2007, 300 limited edition "R-Spec" versions of the BF MKII F6 Typhoon were made available. This model was equipped with several upgrades including stiffer suspension and 19x8-inch alloy wheels which sought to improve the car's handling. Additional upgrades also included leather seats as standard, "R-Spec" floor mats, Interior Car Console MP3 accessory port and F6 R Spec build plates and badging. Colours that the "R-Spec" Typhoon was released in included Winter White, Lightning Strike, Vixen, Neo, Ego, Bionic and Silhouette. Apart from their badging, "R-Spec" Typhoons can be identified by their Thurderstorm Grey inserts seen on the front and rear bumper bars, fog light surrounds, rear spoiler pillars and alloy wheels. The "R-Spec" model was also available as a special order in custom option colour choices. At least 9 units are known to be painted in Ford's Conquer Blue metallic with Dark Argent inserts.

The BF F6 Typhoon is the only non V8-engined "R-Spec" product ever made by FPV. It is also the only limited edition turbo FPV. This will certainly make it one of the most desirable and collectable turbo FPV's.

GT "Cobra" 
In 2008, FPV released a total of 400 Cobra "R-Spec" sedans (plus 100 FPV Super Pursuit "Cobra" utes not badged "GT" or "R-Spec"), which featured a distinctive blue on white paint scheme seen on the XC series Falcon Cobra models of 1978. On release, FPV dealers were charging vastly more (up to an additional $44,000) than the recommended retail price, with early buyers also selling their cars at a premium. This Cobra model has since become highly collectable.

FG series

GT "R-Spec" 
In 2011, FPV presented the GT "Black" at the Sydney Motor Show,. The car featured not only a new look but wheels and suspension changes. The car that went on sale unfortunately was reduced to a simple blacked out paint job and a new matte black strip kit. It wasn't until the R-Spec arrived a year later that the concept changes started to appear.
In 2012 FPV released  codename "Panther", a new track-focused "GT R-Spec", using the current "GT" with its / supercharged 5.0-litre V8 engine, in so doing creating Australia's fastest accelerating production car. For many enthusiasts, this GT "R-Spec" is seen as the spiritual successor of the original "GT-HO" models that ended with the 1971 Ford XY Falcon GT. Ford (and FPV), however, have always remained reluctant to recycle the "HO" nameplate on its modern-day products. The GT R-Spec is still the fastest ever Australian produced Ford over the 1/4mile.

A raft of changes included a launch control system, stiffer engine and transmission mounts and retuned suspension. The suspension gained stiffer upper control arm bushes, stiffer upper strut mounts and retuned dampers at the front, with the rear gaining higher spring rates, retuned dampers, a larger anti-roll bar and reinforced lower control arms. The rear also gained a wider 9-inch wheel package shod with 275/30 R19 tyres and revised toe-link settings. This "R-Spec" also ended up being a louder car than the regular GT and GT-P despite no particular changes to that effect. The R-Spec split public and owners on not only looks but the package as well. For the first and only time Ford/FPV produced a car with major changes in drive and handling. Many existing FPV owners were quick to down play what was actually quiet a good package which significantly improved drive and performance.

In total, 175 units were built painted Silhouette black with red accents and a "C" stripe down each side, echoing the 2012 Ford Mustang "302 Boss" Laguna Seca. Kinetic blue, Vixen and Winter white were the other colours available to order, featuring black accents and stripe package instead.

The NSW Police Force received a Winter White "R-Spec" (build no. 150) to commemorate its 150th Anniversary in 2012.

Performance
 1/4 mile 12.5 at 
 0–100 km/h (0-62 mph) in 4.5 seconds

These times better those set by the rival HSV W427 in 2008, then at the time Australia's quickest production car. Owners have run as quick as 12.1 over the 1/4 mile and 4.3s to 100 km/h.

FG GT-F "351"
In 2014, as a final send-off for the GT, FPV released 550 examples of the GT-F "351". This time, however, "351" nameplate which was used as a tribute to the original Ford Falcon GTs referred to the engine output in kW rather than the forebear's historic cubic capacity. From the outside, the GT-F borrowed the visual features of the preceding "R-Spec" without, however, bearing that badge. It featured a unique stripe kit consisting of a single stripe over the top of the car's body, and the black painted accents on specific areas of the car. Despite the extra engine power, the GT-F was no faster than previous "R-Spec" cars in either a 0-100 sprint or over the 1/4mile during extensive media testing.
 Ford and FPV's limited development budget saw this project completed in just 2 months. The last GT-F unit numbered 500 (50 units went to NZ) was sold on an eBay charity auction for $234,000 and featured a one-off colour and personalised features for the winning bidder.

References

External links
 Ford Performance Vehicles
 GT R-Spec

Cars of Australia
GT R Spec
Full-size vehicles
Rear-wheel-drive vehicles
Sports sedans
Cars introduced in 2012
2010s cars